The Fredkin gate (also CSWAP gate and conservative logic gate) is a computational circuit suitable for reversible computing, invented by Edward Fredkin. It is universal, which means that any logical or arithmetic operation can be constructed entirely of Fredkin gates. The Fredkin gate is a circuit or device with three inputs and three outputs that transmits the first bit unchanged and swaps the last two bits if, and only if, the first bit is 1.

Definition 

The basic Fredkin gate is a controlled swap gate that maps three inputs  onto three outputs . The C input is mapped directly to the C output. It is easy to see that this circuit is reversible, i.e., "undoes" itself when run backwards. A generalized n×n Fredkin gate passes its first n−2 inputs unchanged to the corresponding outputs, and swaps its last two outputs if and only if the first n−2 inputs are all 1.

The Fredkin gate is the reversible three-bit gate that swaps the last two bits if, and only if, the first bit is 1.

It has the useful property that the numbers of 0s and 1s are conserved throughout, which in the billiard ball model means the same number of balls are output as input. This corresponds nicely to the conservation of mass in physics, and helps to show that the model is not wasteful.

Truth functions with AND, OR, XOR, and NOT
The Fredkin gate can be defined using truth functions with AND, OR, XOR, and NOT, as follows:

Cout= Cin

where 

Alternatively:

Cout= Cin

Completeness 

One way to see that the Fredkin gate is universal is to observe that it can be used to implement AND, NOT and OR:
If , then .
If , then .

Example 

Three-bit full adder (add with carry) using five Fredkin gates. The "g" garbage output bit is  if , and  if .

Inputs on the left, including two constants, go through three gates to quickly determine the parity. The 0 and 1 bits swap places for each input bit that is set, resulting in parity bit on the 4th row and inverse of parity on 5th row.

The  and  inputs are only used as gate controls so they appear unchanged in the output.

Quantum Fredkin gate
On March 25, 2016, researchers from Griffith University and the University of Queensland announced they had built a quantum Fredkin gate that uses the quantum entanglement of particles of light to swap qubits.  The availability of quantum Fredkin gates may facilitate the construction of quantum computers.

See also 
Quantum computing
Quantum gate
Quantum circuit
Quantum programming
Toffoli gate, which is a controlled-controlled-NOT gate.

References

Further reading 
 

Logic gates
Quantum gates
Reversible computing